Hania Robledo is an art director.

She was nominated at the 75th Academy Awards in the category of Best Art Direction for her work on the film Frida. Her nomination was shared with Felipe Fernández del Paso.

Selected filmography

 The Mask of Zorro (1998)
 Frida (2002)
 Nacho Libre (2006)
 Beverly Hills Chihuahua (2008)
 Vantage Point (2008)
 Elysium (2013)

References

External links

Living people
Art directors
Year of birth missing (living people)
Place of birth missing (living people)